Christopher Agorsor (born September 1, 1990 in Severn, Maryland) is a former professional American soccer player. He currently works as a real estate agent in Washington, DC.

Career

Youth and college
In high school, he scored 24 goals with eight assists in 15 matches in his junior season, helping his high school team to a Top 5 national ranking in the fall. He was named the Baltimore Sun Player of the Year despite missing nearly 10 matches, and also won Gatorade Player of The Year. Agorsor played college soccer at the University of Virginia but, after a promising start to his college career, suffered a serious knee injury in 2008. Agorsor recovered from this injury and returned to University of Virginia for his sophomore year. Before joining MLS, he spent some time training with Man United and Nacional in Portugal. He also spent the time before his lottery into MLS training with the Philadelphia Union.

Professional
In February 2011, Agorsor signed a contract with Major League Soccer and was allocated to the Philadelphia Union via a weighted lottery on February 14, 2011. Agorsor was waived by the team in June, before making any appearances with the first team.

After his release from Philadelphia, Agorsor went on trial with Real Salt Lake during June and July 2011. Agorsor signed with Salt Lake on July 20, 2011. He made his professional debut on October 6, 2011 during a 3-0 defeat against Vancouver Whitecaps FC.

Real Salt Lake released Agorsor on February 10, 2012, and he most recently played for the Richmond Kickers of USL Pro.

Personal
Agorsor was eligible to play for the US National Team as well as the national team of Ghana.

References

External links

baltimoresun.com

1990 births
Living people
American soccer players
Association football forwards
Major League Soccer players
People from Severn, Maryland
Philadelphia Union players
Real Salt Lake players
Richmond Kickers players
Soccer players from Maryland
Sportspeople from Anne Arundel County, Maryland
United States men's youth international soccer players
USL Championship players
Virginia Cavaliers men's soccer players